Josenii Bârgăului is a commune in Bistrița-Năsăud County, Transylvania, Romania. It is composed of four villages: Josenii Bârgăului, Mijlocenii Bârgăului (Középborgó), Rusu Bârgăului (Oroszborgó), and Strâmba (Dornavölgyitelep).

Natives
Aurel Rău

References

Communes in Bistrița-Năsăud County
Localities in Transylvania